is a district located in Fukui, Japan.

As of October 1, 2005, the district has an estimated population of 12,273 and a density of 35.69 persons per km2. The total area is 343.84 km2.

Towns and villages
The district has one town:

 Minamiechizen

History

Recent mergers
 On January 1, 2005 - The towns of Imajō and Nanjō, and the village of Kōno merged to form the new town of Minamiechizen.

Districts in Fukui Prefecture